Pratt's Bottom is a village in Greater London, England, within the London Borough of Bromley and, prior to 1965, within the historic county of Kent. It is south of its parent parish of Orpington, lies about 100 metres above sea level and beyond London's urban sprawl.

It has frequently been noted on lists of unusual place names.

It is a small village, consisting of a main road (Rushmore Hill) on which is situated a school, a  village shop (the post office was closed as part of the widespread branch closures of June 2008) and the Bulls Head pub, two small churches and a few side roads. There is a village hall behind the green.

History

A "bottom" in this context means a valley or hollow, and the Pratts were a noble family once seated in the area. Pratt's Bottom formed part of the ancient, and later civil, parish of Chelsfield in Kent and was part of the Bromley Rural District from 1896. The parish was abolished in 1934 and the village became part of Orpington Urban District. In 1965 it was transferred to Greater London, to form part of the London Borough of Bromley.

A tollgate stood in the village for many years. The turnpike cottage was demolished in the 1930s but is still seen as emblematic of the village, so much so that it is the basis of the recent village sign placed on the green.
Sue Short has written a book about the history of the village titled Pratts Bottom: A Journey Through Life.

Local Government Elections

Transport
Pratts Bottom, being in the county of Greater London, is under Transport for London remit but is no longer served by London Buses bus services. The nearest rail link to Pratts Bottom is at Knockholt station in Kent.

Nearby areas
Pratts Bottom borders Chelsfield to the north and north east, Badgers Mount to the east, Halstead to the south east, Knockholt to the south and south west, Hazelwood to the west and Green Street Green to the north west.

See also

Rude Britain

References

External links

Historical notes on the village
Pratts Bottom Village Hall

Villages in London
Areas of London
Districts of the London Borough of Bromley
Villages in the London Borough of Bromley